The 1925 Santa Barbara State Roadrunners football team was an American football team that represented Santa Barbara State College during the 1925 college football season.

Santa Barbara State competed as an independent in 1925. Records may be incomplete, but eight games have been documented. The Roadrunners were led by fourth-year head coach Otho J. Gilliland and played home games at Peabody Stadium in Santa Barbara, California. They finished the season with a record of three wins, four losses and one tie (3–4–1). Overall, the team outscored its opponents 82–67 for the season.

Schedule

Notes

References

Santa Barbara State
UC Santa Barbara Gauchos football seasons
Santa Barbara State Roadrunners football